Finest Moments is a 2002 album by Louise.

Finest Moments may also refer to:

The Finest Moments, a 1989 album by Sandi Patty
Finest Moments Volume 1, a 2013 compilation album by Umek